Pouteria howeana, commonly known as axe-handle wood, is a species of small tree in the family Sapotaceae. It is found in the lowlands of Lord Howe Island, and early settlers used its hard wood to make axes.

References

howeana
Taxa named by Ferdinand von Mueller